The 2006–07 NBB Cup (in Dutch: NBB-Beker) was the 39th season of the NBB Cup, the national cup competition for men's basketball teams in the Netherlands.

Matrixx Magixx won its first-ever cup title.

Bracket 
The following is the bracket Fromm the eight finals to the finals.

Final

Statistics 
Statistics for the title game are below. Darnell Hinson scored 26 points for the Capitals, while Alhaji Mohammed led the Magixx in scoring with 23 points.

 Key

References 

NBB Cup
2006–07 in Dutch basketball